Afroneta elgonensis is a species of sheet weaver found in Kenya. It was described by Merrett in 2004.

References

Endemic fauna of Kenya
Linyphiidae
Spiders described in 2004
Spiders of Africa
Invertebrates of Kenya